Merrick is a neighborhood in the southeast corner of West Springfield, Massachusetts. Borders are, Park Ave to the north, Union St. and its industrial buildings to the west, and Bridge St. (or New Bridge St.) to the south and U.S. Route 5. Downtown is to the north and northwest and the neighborhood Memorial, is to the south and southwest. The Connecticut River is to the east. The population as of 2010 was 2,986.

Tornadoes

Merrick is most always the neighborhood in West Side to get hit by tornadoes as 3 tornadoes have hit that area of town. Once in 1923, 1972 (or '7s; EF1 or EF2) and most notably the 2011 New England tornado outbreak on June 1, 2011, which was an EF3.

Downtown West Springfield
Downtown West Springfield is the "center" of the city. It sits on the Connecticut River.

West Springfield, Massachusetts
Neighborhoods in Springfield, Massachusetts